CodeSignal is a technical interview and assessment platform operated by American company BrainFights, Inc. Founded in 2014 and headquartered in San Francisco, the company has raised $87.5 million in total funding, with a Series C round in September 2021.

History 
CodeSignal, initially called CodeFights, was founded in 2014  by Tigran Sloyan, Aram Shatakhtsyan, and Felix Desroches.

CodeFights provided a platform for developers to compete in head-to-head timed coding challenges. In 2017, CodeFights began to offer an interview practice mode, as well as a product for recruiters to connect with qualified technical candidates.

In 2018, the company changed the name of its platform from CodeFights to CodeSignal, and introduced a Coding Score that developers could share with technical recruiters, based on challenges completed on CodeSignal. Since then, the CodeSignal platform has expanded to offer a suite of technical interview and assessment products.

Platform 
The CodeSignal platform consists of Tech Screen, Pre-Screen, and Interview products used by technical recruiters and hiring managers to source and qualify candidates for software engineering positions. Users select from a bank of coding tasks, create custom coding questions, or use a skills assessment framework like the General Coding Assessment (GCA). CodeSignal is a cloud-based software as a service (SaaS) product that integrates with applicant tracking systems (ATS) like Greenhouse and Lever.

Funding 
The company raised an initial $2.5 million in seed funding in April 2015, which included investments by Felicis Ventures (Aydin Senkut), Sutter Hill Ventures (Mike Speiser), LiveRamp CEO Auren Hoffman, Google Shopping Express founder Tom Fallows, Twitter VP of Engineering Raffi Krikorian, Quora CEO Adam D'Angelo and GoDaddy VP of Engineering Marek Olszewski. CodeSignal raised $10 million in November 2016. The Series A funding round was led by e.ventures. Other investors in that round included SV Angel, A Capital, Granatus Ventures, and Felicis Ventures.

CodeSignal raised $25 million in Series B funding in December 2020, led by Menlo Ventures, followed by a $50 million Series C round led by Index Ventures in September 2021.

Customers 
CodeSignal customers include Brex, Databricks, Facebook, Instacart, Robinhood Markets, Upwork and Zoom.

See also 

Karat
HackerRank

References

External links 

CodeSignal

Programming contests
Educational technology